Beginning in 1994, Elton John toured extensively with Billy Joel on a series of Face to Face tours, making them the longest running and most successful concert tandem in pop music history. During these shows, the two have played their own songs, each other's songs and performed duets. They grossed over US $46 million in just 24 days in their sold out 2003 tour. John and Joel resumed the Face to Face tour in March 2009 and it ended again, at least for the time being, in March 2010. Joel denied rumors in the trade press that he canceled a summer 2010 leg of the tour, claiming there were never any dates booked and that he intended to take the year off. Joel stated in 2012 that he would no longer tour with John because it restrains his setlists.

The 1994 tour proved a major success playing to huge audiences in packed stadiums across the U.S. starting in East Coast America and ending in South East America.

Tour dates

Setlist

References

External links

 Information Site with Tour Dates

1994 concert tours
Billy Joel concert tours
Co-headlining concert tours
Elton John concert tours